Martin Aaron Golubitsky is an American Distinguished professor of mathematics at Ohio State University and the former director of the Mathematical Biosciences Institute.

Biography

Education
Marty Golubitsky was born on April 5, 1945 in Philadelphia, Pennsylvania. He graduated with bachelor's degree in 1966 from the University of Pennsylvania and the same year got his master's there as well. He obtained his Ph.D. from Massachusetts Institute of Technology in 1970 where his advisor was Victor Guillemin.

Career

Full-time
From September 1974 to December 1976 he was an assistant professor at the Queens College and from January of next year to August 1979 served as an associate professor there. Starting from the same month of 1979 he relocated himself to the Arizona State University where he became a professor and served there till August 1983. In September of the same year he held the same position at the University of Houston where he remained till November 2008. From then until 2016 he served as the director of the Mathematical Biosciences Institute at Ohio State University where he retains a distinguished professorship in mathematics. He affiliates himself with such organizations as the American Association for the Advancement of Science, American Mathematical Society, Association for Women in Mathematics and Society for Industrial and Applied Mathematics. He served as the President of the Society for Industrial and Applied Mathematics (SIAM) 2005–2006. In 2012 he became an inaugural fellow of the American Mathematical Society. and in 2009 a SIAM Fellow.

Visiting
From January 1980 to June of the same year he worked at University of Nice Sophia Antipolis as a visiting professor and then from September to December of the next year worked at the Duke University. Following that he worked at the University of California, Berkeley, with the same position which lasted him for two months in summer of 1982 and then from January to June 1989 he worked at the Institute for Mathematics and Applications, a division of the University of Minnesota. He continued to hold that position even four years later when from January to June 1993 he was working at the division of University of Waterloo called Fields Institute. From August to November 2005 he worked at both Newton Institute and Trinity College in Cambridge and then from January to June 2006 worked at the University of Toronto as a distinguished professor. As of July 2005 he works as an adjunct professor at the Computational and Applied Mathematics division of Rice University.

Publications
In 1992, he and Ian Stewart wrote a book called Fearful Symmetry: Is God a Geometer? which was published by Blackwell Publishers in Oxford. In 1994 it was translated into Dutch by Hans van Cuijlenborg where it came out under a title of Turings tijger by Epsilon Uitgaven in Utrecht. In 1995 the same work was translated into Italian by Libero Sosio as Terribili simmetrie: Dio è un geometra? and was published in Turin, Italy. His second book, on which he worked with M. Field called Symmetry in Chaos: A Search for Pattern in Mathematics, Art, and Nature was released by Oxford University Press, in 1992 and was followed by German translation by Micha Lotrovsky in 1993 and the French one the same year by Christian Jeanmougin which was published by Inter´Editions in Paris. Besides books he also has numerous peer-reviewed articles and even was a co-editor of the Multiparameter Bifurcation Theory, Contemporary Mathematics which was published by Association for Computing Machinery in 1986.

References

External links
Marty Golubitsky
Marty Golubitsky

1945 births
Living people
20th-century American mathematicians
21st-century American mathematicians
University of Pennsylvania alumni
Arizona State University faculty
University of Houston faculty
University of Minnesota faculty
Rice University faculty
Academic staff of the University of Toronto
Academic staff of the University of Waterloo
Massachusetts Institute of Technology alumni
Fellows of the American Mathematical Society
Mathematicians from Philadelphia
Presidents of the Society for Industrial and Applied Mathematics